Luca Mayr-Fälten (born 6 April 1996) is an Austrian footballer who plays for SK Vorwärts Steyr.

After playing for six years in the United States, Mayr-Fälten signed a contract on 22 December 2021 to return to his hometown and play professionally for Vorwärts Steyr.

References

External links
 Soccerway profile
 South Carolina Gamecocks profile 
 Tormenta FC 2 profile 
 Michigan Bucks profile 

Austrian footballers
Austrian Football Bundesliga players
1996 births
Living people
SV Ried players
Association football forwards
Austrian expatriate footballers
Expatriate soccer players in the United States
Austrian expatriate sportspeople in the United States
South Carolina Gamecocks men's soccer players
USL League Two players
Flint City Bucks players
Austria youth international footballers
People from Steyr
Tormenta FC players
Footballers from Upper Austria